The 2016 Davis Cup was the 105th edition of the Davis Cup, a tournament between national teams in men's tennis. It was sponsored by BNP Paribas. From this season's tournament the deciding set of each match would be settled by a tiebreak at 6 games all rather than playing an advantage set until a player or a team were two games clear. Argentina won their first Davis Cup title, after 4 runner-up finishes, defeating Croatia in the final. Federico Delbonis defeated Ivo Karlović in the final match to give Argentina its first Davis Cup title,  after a comeback from Juan Martín del Potro against Marin Čilić in the fourth match.

World Group

Seeds

Draw

Final

World Group play-offs

Date: 16–18 September

The eight losing teams in the World Group first round ties and eight winners of the Zonal Group I final round ties competed in the World Group play-offs for spots in the 2017 World Group.

Seeded teams
 
 
 
 
 
 
 
 

Unseeded teams
  
  
  
  
  
  
  
  

Americas Zone

Group I

Seeds: 
All seeds received a bye into the second round.

Remaining nations:

Draw

Group II

Seeds: 

Remaining nations:

Draw

Group III

Date: 11–16 July

Location: La Paz, Bolivia (clay)

Confirmed teams:

Inactive teams:

Format: Round-robin basis. Two pools of four and five teams, respectively (Pools A and B). The winner of each pool plays off against the runner-up of the other pool to determine which two nations are promoted to Americas Zone Group II in 2017.

Seeding: The seeding was based on the Davis Cup Rankings of 7 March 2016 (shown in parentheses below).

Group A

Group B

Play-offs

 and  promoted to Group II in 2017.

Asia/Oceania Zone

Group I

Seeds: 
All seeds received a bye into the second round.

 
 

Remaining nations:

Draw

Group II

Seeds:

 
 
 
 

Remaining nations:

Draw

Group III

Date: 11–16 July

Location: Tehran, Iran (clay)

Confirmed teams:

Format: Round-robin basis. Two pools of four and five teams, respectively (Pools A and B). The winner of each pool plays off against the runner-up of the other pool to determine which two nations are promoted to Asia/Oceania Zone Group II in 2017.

Seeding: The seeding was based on the Davis Cup Rankings of 7 March 2016 (shown in parentheses below).

Group A

Group B

Play-offs

 and  promoted to Group II in 2017.

 and  relegated to Group IV in 2017.

Group IV

Date: 13–16 July

Location: Amman, Jordan (clay)

Confirmed teams:

Inactive teams:

Format: Round-robin basis. Two pools of four and five teams, respectively (Pools A and B). The winner of each pool plays off against the runner-up of the other pool to determine which two nations are promoted to Asia/Oceania Zone Group III in 2017.

Seeding: The seeding was based on the Davis Cup Rankings of 7 March 2016 (shown in parentheses below).

Group A

Group B

Play-offs

 and  promoted to Group III in 2017.

Europe/Africa Zone

Group I

Seeds: 
 
 
 
 

Remaining nations:

Draw

Group II

Seeds: 
 
 
 
 
 
 
 
 

Remaining nations:

Draw

Group III Europe

Date: 2–5 March

Location: Tallinn, Estonia (indoor hard)

Format: Round-robin basis. Four pools of four teams (Pools A, B, C and D). The winners of each pool play-off against each other to determine which two nations are promoted to Europe/Africa Zone Group II in 2017.

Seeding: The seeding was based on the Davis Cup Rankings of 30 November 2015 (shown in parentheses below).

Groups:

Group A

Group B

Group C

Group D

Play-offs

 and  promoted to Group II in 2017.

Group III Africa

Date: 11–16 July

Location: Antananarivo, Madagascar (clay)

Confirmed teams:

Inactive teams:

Format: Round-robin basis. Two pools of five teams (Pools A and B). The winner of each pool plays off against the runner-up of the other pool to determine which two nations are promoted to Europe/Africa Zone Group II in 2017.

Seeding: The seeding was based on the Davis Cup Rankings of 7 March 2016 (shown in parentheses below).

Group A

Group B

Play-offs

 and  promoted to Group II in 2017.

References

External links

Official website

 
Davis Cup
Davis Cups by year